Sir Charles Mark Palmer, 5th Baronet (born 21 November 1941) is a British aristocrat, who formed one of the first modelling agencies devoted to the male image, and later adopted an alternative lifestyle, travelling around Britain in a horse-drawn caravan.

Early life
Mark Palmer is the son of Sir Anthony Palmer, 4th Baronet and Henriette, Lady Abel Smith. His godmother is Queen Elizabeth II.

Palmer was educated at Eton College and spent a year at the University of Oxford.

From 1956 to 1959, he was Page of Honour to Queen Elizabeth II.

Career
In 1966, Palmer and Alice Pollock founded the early male modelling agency English Boy in Chelsea, London, with Palmer as manager. As Palmer said, "to change the image of British manhood and put the boy, as opposed to the girl, on the magazine cover in the future." In 1967, the New York Times reported that Palmer's English Boy had 12 young men on its books, "they are lean in the Twiggy style and look as though they need a good night's sleep. They don't smile.", and that they often buy their clothes from Hung On You. Other clients included Christine Keeler, who Palmer wanted to represent for films and television as well as modelling, but according to Keeler, "nothing developed". Brian Jones and Anita Pallenberg were also on the agency's books, but no work resulted.

By the end of the 1960s and into the 1970s, he was the leader of a wealthy band of New Age travellers who moved about in horse-drawn caravans and spent much time in the 1970s at Stargroves, the house and estate in East Woodhay, Hampshire, owned by Mick Jagger.

In 1972, Palmer helped Marc Bolan's wife June with a wide-ranging search for a country house, and they purchased the Grade II listed Old Rectory at Weston-under-Penyard, near Ross-on-Wye, which Bolan owned until 1977.

He made by hand the coffin for the 1999 funeral at London's Brompton Cemetery of the artists' model and memoirist Henrietta Moraes, who had spent time with Palmer in the early 1970s in his "cavalcade of horse-drawn caravans".

Personal life
Palmer was married to the astrologer Catherine Tennant, who wrote a weekly column for the Daily Telegraph's magazine.

Arms

References

External links

1941 births
Living people
Baronets in the Baronetage of the United Kingdom
Pages of Honour
People educated at Eton College
People from Cirencester
People from East Woodhay